B. M. Birla Science Museum is an Indian science museum located in Hyderabad, India. Constructed by civil engineer P. A. Singaravelu, it comprises a planetarium, museum, science centre, art gallery as well as a dinosaurium. The museum itself was the second phase of the science centre when it opened in 1990. The centre also houses India's first private Space Museum. The museum is a unique facility which is dedicated to history of the space program of India. The space museum was inaugurated in July 2019 and was curated by Pranav Sharma.

Planetarium

The Birla Planetarium is a wing of the Science Centre. The planetarium was inaugurated by  N. T. Rama Rao, on 8 September 1985 and is one of three Birla Planetariums in India. The others are the M.P. Birla Planetarium in Kolkata and B.M. Birla Planetarium  in Chennai.

Space Museum 
The space museum is one of a kind in the sense that it has been designed and curated in an interdisciplinary manner, thereby  treating kids and elders alike. Breaking bounds of a traditional space museum, the limits of emphasizing technical details have been reduced, since the information is just a click away. This museum narrates science as a story. The story-tellers begin with ISRO’s legacy, the necessity of a space program, to its establishment and several achievements. You may find some simple yet interesting stories that led to huge science projects. Vikram Sarabhai holds the first hand narrative, Nehru gets to detail his science policy, Bhabha, Satish Dhawan, Yash Pal, and several others get to share their reasons and stories for why they did what they did in this museum. The museum brings to light various contributions of ISRO to public awareness through images, illustrations and words. The reading you get on images is basically excerpts and anecdotes from the actual conversations between people who majorly contributed to ISRO’s legacy. More than forty three people contributed to the narration and which were taken out after some several thousand pages of information and data collected over the span of almost two years by the curator Pranav Sharma. Satyajit Tuljapurkar was the architect of the place and digital artwork was done by Arjun Kota. Ankur Chhabra and Smyan Thota worked as curation assistants and outreach team leads.

There are more than twenty exhibits including the models of PSLV, GSLV, GSLV-MkIII (which recently successfully carried Chandryaan 2 in the outer space). The legacy series of satellites such as Aryabhata, Bhaskara, Rohini, APPLE and SROSS are also exhibited. A model of International Space Station has been set up amidst Communication Satellites which resonates the essence of architectural design of the museum. Different sections have been designed on purpose, in a maze like structure, each having relevance of its own so that the impact on the viewers is distinctive and this helps in more indulgence with the information and trivia presented in that particular section. The maze contributes to the continual amazement that the visitor experiences.

Excerpts from literature and poetry explaining difficult themes and are placed as riddles all over the museum, venerating the contributions of artists and writers such as Shakespeare and Rabindranath Tagore, who wrote about the moon and the stars and the space. This interdisciplinary method of imparting knowledge, while being relevant to the theme of the museum has been the fundamental idea since the beginning of this museum’s curation and idea.

Dinosaurium

The Dinosaurium is the newest addition to the planetarium and science center and opened in 2000. Its exhibits include a 160-million-year-old mounted Kotasaurus yamanpalliensis, excavated in the Adilabad district in Telangana and presented to the Science Museum by the Geological Survey of India. The Dinosaurium has a collection of smaller fossils of dinosaur eggs, marine shells and fossilised tree trunks.

See also
M. P. Birla Institute of Fundamental Research
List of planetariums
Nizam Museum

References

External links

B.M. Birla Science Centre, Hyderabad
M.P. Birla Planetarium, Kolkata

Museums in Hyderabad, India
Museums in Telangana
Science museums in India
Planetaria in India
Science and technology in Hyderabad, India
Museums established in 1985
1985 establishments in Andhra Pradesh
Tourist attractions in Hyderabad, India